USS Myles C. Fox (DE-546) was a proposed World War II United States Navy John C. Butler-class destroyer escort that was never completed.

Myles C. Fox was to have been built at the Boston Navy Yard in Boston, Massachusetts.  However, her construction was cancelled on 10 June 1944.

The name Myles C. Fox was reassigned to the destroyer USS Myles C. Fox (DD-829).

References

Navsource Naval History: Photographic History of the U.S. Navy: Destroyer Escorts, Frigates, Littoral Warfare Vessels

John C. Butler-class destroyer escorts
Cancelled ships of the United States Navy